The 2011–12 Perth Glory FC season was the club's 15th season since its establishment in 1996. The club competed in the A-League for the 7th time. The club participated in its first A-League Grand Final this season, its 5th overall.

Players

First team squad

Transfers

In:

 

Out:

Matches

2011–12 Pre-season friendlies

2011–12 Hyundai A-League

Results by round

Results summary

Fixtures & Results

2011–12 Finals Series

Grand Final

Statistics

Goal scorers

Disciplinary record

References

2011-12
2011–12 A-League season by team